Ophion is a genus of ichneumonid wasps, which are nocturnal, parasitic, and often seen at lights. They are mostly orange to yellow in colour and are endoparasites of insect larvae, particularly Lepidoptera. They are very diverse but morphologically very similar. They have a worldwide distribution but the majority of species are found in the temperate zone.

The genus Ophion is distinguished by the absence of a transverse keel on the hind mesosternum. They also have a long membranous flange to the spur on the foretibia.  They are within the same tribe as Afrophion, Alophophion, Xylophion, Sclerophion, and Rhopalophion.

Species 
There are 17 species of Ophion described from the Nearctic and 79 in the Palearctic.

References 

Ichneumonidae genera
Ichneumonidae